Naddazza Valera Albreus (born 1987) is a Cuban team handball player. She has played on the Cuban national team, and participated at the 2011 World Women's Handball Championship in Brazil.

References

1987 births
Living people
Cuban female handball players
21st-century Cuban women